Historic Hyde Park North is a neighborhood within the Hyde Park district of the city of Tampa, Florida. As of the 2010 census the neighborhood had a population of 2,689. The latest estimated population given was 2,447. The ZIP Code serving the neighborhood is 33606.

Geography
Historic Hyde Park North boundaries are roughly the Lee Roy Selmon Expressway to the northwest and north, Bayshore Boulevard to the southeast, Swann Avenue to the south, and South Boulevard/Rome Avenue to the east.

Demographics
Source: Hillsborough County Atlas

At the 2010 census there were 2,689 people and 1,493 households residing in the neighborhood. The population density was 6,769/mi². The racial makeup of the neighborhood was 92% White, 2% African American, less than 1% Native American, 3% Asian, 1% from other races, and 2% from two or more races. Hispanic or Latino of any race were 8%.

Of the 1,493 households 15% had children under the age of 18 living with them, 28% were married couples living together, 4% had a female householder with no husband present, and 14% were non-families. 51% of households were made up of individuals.

The age distribution was 15% under the age of 18, 32% from 18 to 34, 27% from 35 to 49, 19% from 50 to 64, and 7% 65 or older. For every 100 females, there were 92.8 males.

The per capita income for the neighborhood was $46,164. About 5% of the population were below the poverty line, 2% of those are under the age of 18.

Education
Historic Hyde Park North is served by Hillsborough County Public Schools, which serves the city of Tampa and Hillsborough County.

See also
Neighborhoods in Tampa, Florida
Hyde Park

References

External links
Historic Hyde Park North Association, Inc
Neighborhood profile from city-data.com

Neighborhoods in Tampa, Florida
Populated places on Tampa Bay